Alexandra Ianculescu (born 21 October 1991) is a Romanian-Canadian speed skater.

She immigrated with her family to Toronto, Ontario in 2001, and since 2008 trains and resides in Calgary, Alberta. Ianculescu was a member of the Canadian junior national speed skating team in 2011, and represented Canada at two junior championships. She later represented Canada on the World Cup circuit as a senior skater, competing in the 500m and the 1000m distances. In 2016, Alexandra competed for Romania in long track speed skating. She competed in the women's 500 metres at the 2018 Winter Olympics for Romania. In 2020, Ianculescu moved to Europe to train in Heerenveen, Netherlands, and now resides in Germany where she is training in both road cycling and speed skating.

References

External links
 
 Alexandra Ianculescu at SpeedskatingResults.com
 Alexandra Ianculescu at Speedskating.ca

1991 births
Living people
Canadian female speed skaters
Romanian female speed skaters
Olympic speed skaters of Romania
Speed skaters at the 2018 Winter Olympics
Sportspeople from Sibiu
Canadian people of Romanian descent